Mariana Isabel González Parra (born September 17, 1979, in Maracaibo, Zulia) is a female fencer from Venezuela. She twice competed for her native country at the Summer Olympics (2004 and 2008) in the foil competition, and won two gold medals at the 2007 Pan American Games.

References

1979 births
Living people
Venezuelan female foil fencers
Olympic fencers of Venezuela
Fencers at the 2004 Summer Olympics
Fencers at the 2007 Pan American Games
Fencers at the 2008 Summer Olympics
Fencers at the 2011 Pan American Games
Sportspeople from Maracaibo
Pan American Games gold medalists for Venezuela
Pan American Games bronze medalists for Venezuela
Pan American Games medalists in fencing
South American Games gold medalists for Venezuela
South American Games medalists in fencing
Competitors at the 2010 South American Games
Medalists at the 2011 Pan American Games
21st-century Venezuelan women